Nōshū or Noshu may refer to:

 Nōshū, another name for Mino Province.

 Nōshū, another name for Noto Province.